Laws regulating the use of electronic cigarettes, also known as "vaping", vary across the United States. Some states and municipalities prohibit vaping in every location where smoking is prohibited, while others contain more permissive laws or no laws at all regarding vaping.

Indoor bans

In August 2016, a World Health Organization (WHO) report recommended that e-cigarettes be banned in indoor areas or where smoking is prohibited. This is because of their potential for non-users to be exposed to chemicals and e-cigarette aerosol in indoor areas. Many local and state jurisdictions have recently begun enacting laws that prohibit e-cigarette usage everywhere that smoking is banned, although some state laws with comprehensive smoke-free laws will still allow for vaping to be permitted in bars and restaurants while prohibiting e-cigarettes in other indoor places. The only states that do not regulate indoor vaping at all, be it by state territory or on a local level, are in the states of Nebraska, Nevada, and Tennessee.

Alabama
Localities with vaping bans that include all bars and restaurants (11 total): 
Anniston, July 1, 2013, banned in all enclosed workplaces, including bars and restaurants
Clay, January 6, 2012, banned in all enclosed workplaces, including bars and restaurants
Creola, April 25, 2013, banned in all enclosed workplaces, including bars and restaurants
Fultondale, September 1, 2011, banned in all enclosed workplaces, including bars and restaurants; also includes private clubs
Gadsden, January 1, 2015, banned in all enclosed workplaces, including bars and restaurants
Homewood, November 19, 2015, banned in all enclosed workplaces, including bars and restaurants
Midfield, December 28, 2011, banned in all enclosed workplaces, including bars and restaurants
Monroeville, March 19, 2013, banned in all enclosed workplaces, including bars and restaurants
Mountain Brook, October 19, 2016, banned in all enclosed workplaces, including bars and restaurants
Troy, June 25, 2013, banned in all enclosed workplaces, including bars and restaurants
Vestavia Hills, August 26, 2013, banned in workplaces, bars, restaurants, hotels/motels, and within  of entrances and exits
Localities with vaping bans that do not include all bars and restaurants (3 total):
Bessemer, November 1, 2012, banned in all enclosed workplaces, including restaurants but exempting bars
Foley, June 18, 2014, banned in all enclosed workplaces, including restaurants but exempting bars
Opelika, October 7, 2014, banned in all enclosed workplaces, including restaurants but exempting bars
Localities with vaping bans that do not include bars and restaurants (2 total):
Daphne, August 18, 2014 banned in enclosed facilities owned, operated or leased by the city, including vehicles; vaping can also be prohibited where there is an owner, operator, manager, or other person having control of a place meeting certain criteria
Madison, November 24, 2014, banned in all city buildings

Alaska
Localities with vaping bans that include bars and restaurants (3 total):
Dillingham, banned in bars and restaurants, but not other workplaces
Juneau, banned in all enclosed workplaces, including bars and restaurants
Palmer, banned in all enclosed workplaces, including bars and restaurants

Arizona
Localities in Arizona with vaping bans that include bars and restaurants (1 total):
Tempe, banned in all enclosed workplaces, including bars and restaurants
Localities in Arizona with vaping bans that do not include all bars and restaurants (1 total):
Coconino County, banned in all enclosed workplaces, including restaurants but exempting bars

Arkansas
No statewide vaping ban. Instead, vaping is generally prohibited on school property, although localities may choose to enact rules of their own that govern e-cigarette use, but so far, only Wooster has done so

California
Statewide vaping ban As of June 2016, e-cigarettes are included in California's smoke free laws. E-cigarette use is prohibited in workplaces and many public spaces, including restaurants and bars. It is allowed wherever smoking is allowed. Communities can have stronger e-cigarette laws, e.g. covering parks, beaches, bus stops, outdoor worksites, and so on. Sale of e-cigarettes to persons under 21 is prohibited. In June 2019, San Francisco banned the sale of e-cigarettes in the city from early 2020. The ban was made effective by a citywide ordinance signed by Mayor London Breed in July 2019. The ban will be the first of its kind in the United States, since a similar one in Beverly Hills does not take effect until 2021.

Colorado
Statewide vaping ban. Localities may regulate vaping more stringently than the state. 
Localities with vaping bans that include all bars and restaurants (16 total):
Arvada, banned in all enclosed workplaces, including bars and restaurants; exempts partial theatrical productions and specialty vaping stores
Boulder, banned in all enclosed workplaces, including bars and restaurants
Breckenridge, banned in bars and restaurants, but not other workplaces
Brighton, banned in bars and restaurants, but not other workplaces
Edgewater, banned in all enclosed workplaces, including bars and restaurants
Evans, banned in bars and restaurants, but not other workplaces
Fort Collins, banned in all enclosed workplaces, including bars and restaurants
Frisco, banned in bars and restaurants, but not other workplaces
Golden, banned in bars and restaurants, but not other workplaces
Greeley, banned in bars and restaurants, any public access buildings including businesses, and within 50 feet of outdoor seating areas for events
Greenwood Village, banned in bars and restaurants, but not other workplaces
Lafayette, banned in bars and restaurants, but not other workplaces
Lakewood, banned in all enclosed workplaces, including bars and restaurants
Littleton, banned in bars and restaurants, but not other workplaces 
Louisville, banned in bars and restaurants, but not other workplaces
Wheat Ridge, banned in bars and restaurants, but not other workplaces

Connecticut
Statewide vaping ban in restaurants, bars, government buildings, health care institutions, retail food stores, school buildings, child care facilities, elevators, college dormitories, and gambling facilities, since 2015.

Delaware

Statewide vaping ban. Effective September 5, 2015, vaping is prohibited in all places that smoking is banned, which includes bars & restaurants, as signed into law by Governor Jack Markell. Localities may regulate vaping more stringently than the state.

Florida
In 2018, Florida voters approved a constitutional amendment to ban vaping in most indoor workplaces, effective July 2019.
Localities with vaping bans that do not include all bars and restaurants (19 total):
Alachua County, banned in all enclosed workplaces, including restaurants but exempting bars
Archer, banned in all enclosed workplaces, including restaurants but exempting bars
Belleview, banned in all enclosed workplaces, including restaurants but exempting bars
Boca Raton, banned in all enclosed workplaces, including restaurants but exempting bars
Clay County, banned in all enclosed workplaces, including restaurants but exempting bars
Miami-Dade County, banned in all enclosed workplaces, including restaurants but exempting bars
Delray Beach, banned in all enclosed workplaces, including restaurants but exempting bars
Gainesville, banned in all enclosed workplaces, including restaurants but exempting bars
Hawthorne, banned in all enclosed workplaces, including restaurants but exempting bars
High Springs, banned in all enclosed workplaces, including restaurants but exempting bars
Lighthouse Point, banned in all enclosed workplaces, including restaurants but exempting bars
Marion County, banned in all enclosed workplaces, including restaurants but exempting bars
Miami, banned in all enclosed workplaces, including restaurants but exempting bars 
Newberry, banned in all enclosed workplaces, including restaurants but exempting bars
Orange Park, banned in all enclosed workplaces, including restaurants but exempting bars
Port Saint Lucie, banned in all enclosed workplaces, including restaurants but exempting bars
Port St. Joe, banned in all enclosed workplaces, including restaurants but exempting bars
Vero Beach, banned in all enclosed workplaces, including restaurants but exempting bars
Waldo, banned in all enclosed workplaces, including restaurants but exempting bars

Georgia
No statewide vaping ban. Instead, vaping is prohibited only on all campuses of University System of Georgia, with limited exceptions for educational purposes and research. Municipalities may regulate vaping more stringently than the state. Roswell bans vaping in all city parks
Localities with vaping bans that include all bars and restaurants (3 total):
Chatham County, banned in all enclosed workplaces, including bars and restaurants
Pooler, banned in all enclosed workplaces, including bars and restaurants
Savannah, banned in all enclosed workplaces, including bars and restaurantsLocalities with vaping bans that do not include all bars and restaurants (1 total):DeKalb County, banned in all enclosed workplaces, exempting bars and restaurants

HawaiiStatewide vaping ban. In April 2015 a bill passed that makes it no longer legal for vaping to be permitted in workplaces and other public places. In June 2015 Hawaii raised the legal age to purchase traditional cigarettes and electronic cigarettes to 21.

Idaho
Ketchum, banned in all enclosed workplaces, including bars and restaurants

IllinoisNo statewide vaping ban. Instead, vaping is prohibited on all campuses of state-supported institutions of higher education, including buildings, grounds, parking lots, and vehicles owned by institutions. Enclosed research laboratories are exempt, as well as bars, restaurants, workplaces and all other indoor places where smoking is banned under the Illinois Clean Indoor Air Act. Localities may regulate vaping more stringently than the state. Localities with vaping bans that include all bars and restaurants (13 total):Chicago, banned in all enclosed workplaces, including bars and restaurants; exempts vape shops.
Deerfield, banned in all enclosed workplaces, including bars and restaurants
DeKalb, banned in all enclosed workplaces, including bars and restaurants
Elgin, banned in all enclosed workplaces, including bars and restaurants
Elk Grove Village, banned in all enclosed workplaces, including bars and restaurants
Evanston, banned in all enclosed workplaces, including bars and restaurants
Naperville, banned in all enclosed workplaces, including bars and restaurants
New Lenox, banned in all enclosed workplaces, including bars and restaurants 
Oak Park, banned in all enclosed workplaces, including bars and restaurants
Ogle County, banned in all enclosed workplaces, including bars and restaurants
Schaumburg, banned in all enclosed workplaces, including bars and restaurants
Skokie, banned in all enclosed workplaces, including bars and restaurants
Wilmette, banned in all enclosed workplaces, including bars and restaurantsLocalities with vaping bans that do not include all bars and restaurants (2 total):Arlington Heights, banned in all enclosed workplaces, including restaurants but exempting bars
Wheaton, banned in all enclosed workplaces, including restaurants but exempting bars

IndianaLocalities with vaping bans that include all bars and restaurants (1 total):Indianapolis, banned in all enclosed workplaces, including bars and restaurantsLocalities with vaping bans that do not include all bars and restaurants (1 total):Greenwood, banned in all enclosed workplaces, exempting bars and restaurants

IowaLocalities with vaping bans that include all bars and restaurants (4 total):Ames, banned in all enclosed workplaces, including bars and restaurants
Coralville, banned in all enclosed workplaces, including bars and restaurants
Iowa City, July 16, 2015, banned in all enclosed workplaces, including bars and restaurants or selling to minors.
North Liberty, banned in all enclosed workplaces, including bars and restaurants

KansasNo statewide vaping ban. Instead, vaping is generally prohibited on all Department of Corrections property and grounds, by both employees and inmates, with no exceptions whatsoever. All other indoor places, including bars, restaurants, and gambling facilities are entirely exempt from the state e-cigarette regulations. Localities may regulate vaping more stringently than the state.Localities with vaping bans that include all bars and restaurants (7 total):Eudora, banned in all enclosed workplaces, including bars and restaurants
Hutchinson, banned in all enclosed workplaces, including bars and restaurants
Manhattan, banned in all enclosed workplaces, including bars and restaurants
Olathe, banned in all enclosed workplaces, including bars and restaurants
Overland Park, banned in all enclosed workplaces, including bars and restaurants
Park City, banned in all enclosed workplaces, including bars and restaurants
Topeka, banned in all enclosed workplaces, including bars and restaurants
Wyandotte County, banned in all enclosed workplaces, including bars and restaurants

Kentucky No statewide vaping ban. Instead, vaping is prohibited only on all properties of State Executive Branch, including buildings, vehicles, and land, but excluding specific outdoor areas such as parks, Kentucky Horse Park, and Kentucky State Fairgrounds. Per Governor's Office, does not apply to State colleges and universities. Localities may regulate vaping more stringently than the state.Localities with vaping bans that include all bars and restaurants (10 total):Bardstown, banned in all enclosed workplaces, including bars and restaurants
Berea, banned in all enclosed workplaces, including bars and restaurants
Danville, banned in all enclosed workplaces, including bars and restaurants, as well as within ten feet of the entrance of any such place
Glasgow, banned in bars and restaurants, but not all other workplaces
Lexington, banned in all enclosed workplaces, including bars and restaurants
Manchester, banned in all enclosed workplaces, including bars and restaurants
Morehead, banned in all enclosed workplaces, including bars and restaurants
Richmond, September 9, 2014, banned in all enclosed workplaces, including bars and restaurants
Versailles, October 6, 2014, banned in all enclosed workplaces, including bars and restaurants
Woodford County, banned in all enclosed workplaces, including bars and restaurants

LouisianaLocalities with vaping bans that include all bars and restaurants (7 total):Abbeville, banned in all enclosed workplaces, including bars and restaurants
Cheneyville, banned in all enclosed workplaces, including bars and restaurants
Hammond, banned in all enclosed workplaces, including bars and restaurants 
Monroe, banned in all enclosed workplaces, including bars and restaurants
New Orleans, banned in all enclosed workplaces, including bars and restaurants
Ouachita Parish, banned in all enclosed workplaces, including bars and restaurants
West Monroe, banned in all enclosed workplaces, including bars and restaurantsLocalities with vaping bans that do not include all bars and restaurants (1 total):Sulphur, banned in all enclosed workplaces, including bars and restaurants
Lake Charles, banned in all enclosed workplaces, including bars and restaurants

MaineStatewide vaping ban. Effective October 1, 2015, vaping is prohibited in all smoke-free areas, which included bars and restaurants. Localities may regulate vaping more stringently than the state.

MarylandNo statewide vaping ban. Instead, vaping is prohibited only on MARC commuter rail system trains. All other indoor places, including bars and restaurants, that are subject to the Maryland Clean Indoor Air Act are entirely exempt from the state's vaping regulations. Localities may regulate vaping more stringently than the state. Localities with vaping bans that include all bars and restaurants (3 total):Howard County, July 31, 2015, banned in bars, restaurants, stores, offices, sports complexes and at open-air concerts.
Montgomery County, banned in bars and restaurants, but not other workplaces
Prince George's County, banned in bars and restaurants, but not other workplaces; exempts video lottery establishmentsLocalities with vaping bans that do not include all bars and restaurants (1 total):Baltimore, banned in all enclosed workplaces, exempting bars and restaurants; also exempts video lottery facilities and e-cigarette shops

Massachusetts
 Governor Charlie Baker ordered a 4 month ban on all e-cigarette sales. This was later changed to a ban lasting indefinitely.
Vaping is banned on all state college & university campuses.Localities with vaping bans that include all bars and restaurants (116 total):Acton, banned in all enclosed workplaces, including bars and restaurants
Adams, banned in all enclosed workplaces, including bars and restaurants
Amherst, banned in all enclosed workplaces, including bars and restaurants
Andover, banned in all enclosed workplaces, including bars and restaurants
Arlington, banned in all enclosed workplaces, including bars and restaurants
Ashland, banned in all enclosed workplaces, including bars and restaurants 
Athol, banned in all enclosed workplaces, including bars and restaurants
Attleboro, banned in all enclosed workplaces, including bars and restaurants
Auburn, banned in all enclosed workplaces, including bars and restaurants
Barre, banned in all enclosed workplaces, including bars and restaurants
Billerica, banned in all enclosed workplaces, including bars and restaurants
Bolton, banned in all enclosed workplaces, including bars and restaurants
Boston, banned in all enclosed workplaces, including bars and restaurants 
Bourne, banned in all enclosed workplaces, including bars and restaurants
Bridgewater, banned in all enclosed workplaces, including bars and restaurants
Buckland, banned in all enclosed workplaces, including bars and restaurants
Burlington, banned in all enclosed workplaces, including bars and restaurants
Cambridge, banned in all enclosed workplaces, including bars and restaurants; exempts Housing Authority developments & outdoor restaurant & bar patios
Charlemont, banned in all enclosed workplaces, including bars and restaurants
Cohasset, banned in all enclosed workplaces, including bars and restaurants
Concord, banned in all enclosed workplaces, including bars and restaurants
Dartmouth, banned in all enclosed workplaces, including bars and restaurants
Dedham, banned in all enclosed workplaces, including bars and restaurants
Deerfield, banned in all enclosed workplaces, including bars and restaurants
Dighton, banned in all enclosed workplaces, including bars and restaurants
Dover, banned in bars and restaurants, but not other workplaces
Dracut, banned in all enclosed workplaces, including bars and restaurants
Eastham, banned in all enclosed workplaces, including bars and restaurants
Easthampton, banned in all enclosed workplaces, including bars and restaurants
Fairhaven, banned in all enclosed workplaces, including bars and restaurants
Fitchburg, banned in all enclosed workplaces, including bars and restaurants
Foxborough, banned in all enclosed workplaces, including bars and restaurants
Franklin, banned in all enclosed workplaces, including bars and restaurants
Gardner, banned in all enclosed workplaces, including bars and restaurants
Gill, banned in all enclosed workplaces, including bars and restaurants
Gloucester, banned in all enclosed workplaces, including bars and restaurants 
Grafton, banned in all enclosed workplaces, including bars and restaurants
Granby, banned in all enclosed workplaces, including bars and restaurants
Great Barrington, banned in all enclosed workplaces, including bars and restaurants
Greenfield, banned in all enclosed workplaces, including bars and restaurants
Halifax, banned in all enclosed workplaces, including bars and restaurants
Hamilton, banned in all enclosed workplaces, including bars and restaurants
Hatfield, banned in all enclosed workplaces, including bars and restaurants; exempts hotels/motels
Haverhill, banned in all enclosed workplaces, including bars and restaurants
Holyoke, banned in all enclosed workplaces, including bars and restaurants
Hubbardston, banned in all enclosed workplaces, including bars and restaurants
Hudson, banned in all enclosed workplaces, including bars and restaurants
Hull, banned in all enclosed workplaces, including bars and restaurants
Lee, banned in all enclosed workplaces, including bars and restaurants
Leicester, banned in all enclosed workplaces, including bars and restaurants
Lenox, banned in all enclosed workplaces, including bars and restaurants
Leominster, banned in all enclosed workplaces, including bars and restaurants
Leverett, banned in all enclosed workplaces, including bars and restaurants
Lexington, banned in all enclosed workplaces, including bars and restaurants
Lynn, banned in all enclosed workplaces, including bars and restaurants
Lynnfield, banned in all enclosed workplaces, including bars and restaurants
Marblehead, banned in all enclosed workplaces, including bars and restaurants
Marion, banned in all enclosed workplaces, including bars and restaurants
Marlborough, banned in all enclosed workplaces, including bars and restaurants 
Marshfield, banned in all enclosed workplaces, including bars and restaurants
Mashpee, banned in all enclosed workplaces, including bars and restaurants
Medfield, banned in all enclosed workplaces, including bars and restaurants
Medway, banned in all enclosed workplaces, including bars and restaurants
Methuen, banned in all enclosed workplaces, including bars and restaurants
Milford, banned in all enclosed workplaces, including bars and restaurants
Montague, banned in all enclosed workplaces, including bars and restaurants
Natick, banned in all enclosed workplaces, including bars and restaurants 
Needham, banned in all enclosed workplaces, including bars and restaurants
New Bedford, banned in all enclosed workplaces, including bars and restaurants
Newburyport, banned in all enclosed workplaces, including bars and restaurants
Newton, banned in all enclosed workplaces, including bars and restaurants
Northampton, banned in all enclosed workplaces, including bars and restaurants
North Andover, banned in all enclosed workplaces, including bars and restaurants
North Attleborough, banned in all enclosed workplaces, including bars and restaurants
North Reading, banned in all enclosed workplaces, including bars and restaurants
Orange, banned in all enclosed workplaces, including bars and restaurants
Orleans, banned in all enclosed workplaces, including bars and restaurants
Oxford, banned in all enclosed workplaces, including bars and restaurants
Pittsfield, banned in all enclosed workplaces, including bars and restaurants
Plainville, banned in all enclosed workplaces, including bars and restaurants
Provincetown, banned in all enclosed workplaces, including bars and restaurants
Reading, banned in all enclosed workplaces, including bars and restaurants 
Rockland, September 3, 2015, banned in all enclosed workplaces, including bars and restaurants
Salem, banned in all enclosed workplaces, including bars and restaurants
Saugus, banned in all enclosed workplaces, including bars and restaurants
Sharon, banned in all enclosed workplaces, including bars and restaurants
Shelburne, banned in all enclosed workplaces, including bars and restaurants
Sherborn, banned in all enclosed workplaces, including bars and restaurants
Shrewsbury, banned in all enclosed workplaces, including bars and restaurants
Somerset, banned in all enclosed workplaces, including bars and restaurants
Somerville, banned in all enclosed workplaces, including bars and restaurants
South Hadley, banned in all enclosed workplaces, including bars and restaurants
Stockbridge, banned in all enclosed workplaces, including bars and restaurants
Sunderland, banned in all enclosed workplaces, including bars and restaurants
Sutton, banned in all enclosed workplaces, including bars and restaurants
Swampscott, banned in all enclosed workplaces, including bars and restaurants
Swansea, banned in all enclosed workplaces, including bars and restaurants 
Taunton, banned in all enclosed workplaces, including bars and restaurants
Tewksbury, banned in all enclosed workplaces, including bars and restaurants
Townsend, banned in all enclosed workplaces, including bars and restaurants
Tynsborough, banned in all enclosed workplaces, including bars and restaurants
Wakefield, banned in all enclosed workplaces, including bars and restaurants
Watertown, banned in all enclosed workplaces, including bars and restaurants
Wayland, banned in all enclosed workplaces, including bars and restaurants
Webster, banned in all enclosed workplaces, including bars and restaurants
Wendell, banned in all enclosed workplaces, including bars and restaurants
West Springfield, banned in all enclosed workplaces, including bars and restaurants
Westminster, banned in all enclosed workplaces, including bars and restaurants
Westport, banned in all enclosed workplaces, including bars and restaurants
Westwood, banned in all enclosed workplaces, including bars and restaurants
Weymouth, banned in all enclosed workplaces, including bars and restaurants
Whately, banned in all enclosed workplaces, including bars and restaurants
Williamstown, banned in all enclosed workplaces, including bars and restaurants
Winchendon, banned in all enclosed workplaces, including bars and restaurants
Winchester, banned in all enclosed workplaces, including bars and restaurants 
Worcester, banned in all enclosed workplaces, including bars and restaurants
Yarmouth, banned in all enclosed workplaces, including bars and restaurants

Michigan
Washtenaw County, banned in all enclosed workplaces, exempting bars and restaurants and is not illegal to use a "vaporizer" inside of domestic homes, houses, etc.
Canton, use of electronic cigarettes by minors is a misdemeanor
Eaton Rapids, use of electronic cigarettes by minors is a civil infraction.
Hastings, Use of electronic cigarettes by minors is a civil infraction.
Port Huron, use or possession of e-cigarettes, Vapor Products, or Alternative Nicotine Products by minors is a misdemeanor. Also prohibited is the sale or furnishing of said items to minors. Smoking for any purposes outside of the cooking of food is not allowed in city parks or beaches.

MinnesotaNo statewide vaping ban. Instead, vaping is prohibited only in state and local government buildings, facilities of state colleges and universities, facilities licensed by Commissioner of Human Services, and facilities licensed by Commissioner of Health. All other indoor places subject to the Minnesota Clean Indoor Air Act, including bars and restaurants, are entirely exempt from the state's regulation. Localities may regulate vaping more stringently than the state.Localities with vaping bans that include all bars and restaurants (38 total):Austin, banned in all enclosed workplaces, including bars and restaurants; use of vaporized medical marijuana permitted wherever not prohibited by State law
Beltrami County, banned in all enclosed workplaces, including bars and restaurants; exempts e-cigarette shops for purposes of sampling non-nicotine substances
Big Stone County, banned in all enclosed workplaces, including bars and restaurants
Bloomington, banned in all enclosed workplaces, including bars and restaurants
Chippewa County, banned in all enclosed workplaces, including bars and restaurants
Clay County, banned in all enclosed workplaces, including bars and restaurants
Duluth, banned in all enclosed workplaces, including bars and restaurants
Eagle Lake, banned in all enclosed workplaces, including bars and restaurants
Eden Prairie, banned in all enclosed workplaces, including bars and restaurants
Edina, banned in bars and restaurants, but not other workplaces
Elk River, banned in all enclosed workplaces, including bars and restaurants
Ely, banned in all enclosed workplaces, including bars and restaurants
Glyndon, banned in all enclosed workplaces, including bars and restaurants
Hennepin County, banned in all enclosed workplaces, including bars and restaurants
Hermantown, banned in all enclosed workplaces, including bars and restaurants
Houston County, banned in all enclosed workplaces, including bars and restaurants
Isanti, banned in all enclosed workplaces, including bars and restaurants
Jordan, banned in bars and restaurants, but not other workplaces
Lac Qui Parle County, banned in all enclosed workplaces, including bars and restaurants 
Lakeville, banned in all enclosed workplaces, including bars and restaurants
Mankato, banned in all enclosed workplaces, including bars and restaurants
Marshall County, banned in all enclosed workplaces, including bars and restaurants
Minneapolis, banned in all enclosed workplaces, including bars and restaurants
Moorhead, banned in all enclosed workplaces, including bars and restaurants
North Mankato, banned in all enclosed workplaces, including bars and restaurants
Olmsted County, banned in all enclosed workplaces, including bars and restaurants; use of vaporized medical marijuana permitted wherever not prohibited by law
Orono, banned in all enclosed workplaces, including bars and restaurants
Perham, banned in all enclosed workplaces, including bars and restaurants
Ramsey County, banned in all enclosed workplaces, including bars and restaurants
Red Wing, banned in all enclosed workplaces, including bars and restaurants
Richfield, banned in all enclosed workplaces, including bars and restaurants
Savage, banned in all enclosed workplaces, including bars and restaurants
Sleepy Eye, banned in all enclosed workplaces, including bars and restaurants
St. Anthony, banned in all enclosed workplaces, including bars and restaurants
St. Louis County, banned in all enclosed workplaces, including bars and restaurants
Steele County, banned in all enclosed workplaces, including bars and restaurants
Waseca, banned in all enclosed workplaces, including bars and restaurants
Wilkin County, banned in all enclosed workplaces, including bars and restaurants

MississippiLocalities with vaping bans that include all bars and restaurants (55 total):Anguilla, banned in all enclosed workplaces, including all bars and restaurants
Arcola, banned in all enclosed workplaces, including all bars and restaurants
Baldwyn, banned in all enclosed workplaces, including all bars and restaurants
Bassfield, banned in all enclosed workplaces, including all bars and restaurants
Beulah, banned in all enclosed workplaces, including all bars and restaurants
Brandon, banned in all enclosed workplaces, including all bars and restaurants 
Bruce, banned in all enclosed workplaces, including all bars and restaurants
Byram, banned in all enclosed workplaces, including all bars and restaurants
Calhoun City, banned in all enclosed workplaces, including all bars and restaurants
Clinton, banned in all bars and restaurants, but not other workplaces
Centreville, banned in all enclosed workplaces, including all bars and restaurants
Coahoma County, banned in all enclosed workplaces, including all bars and restaurants
Courtland, banned in all enclosed workplaces, including all bars and restaurants
Crawford, banned in all enclosed workplaces, including all bars and restaurants
Duck Hill, banned in all enclosed workplaces, including all bars and restaurants
Duncan, banned in all enclosed workplaces, including all bars and restaurants
Durant, banned in all enclosed workplaces, including all bars and restaurants
Ethel, banned in all enclosed workplaces, including all bars and restaurants
Farmington, banned in all enclosed workplaces, including all bars and restaurants
Fayette, banned in all enclosed workplaces, including all bars and restaurants
Forest, banned in all enclosed workplaces, including all bars and restaurants
Friars Point, banned in all enclosed workplaces, including all bars and restaurants
Georgetown, banned in all enclosed workplaces, including all bars and restaurants
Holly Springs, banned in all enclosed workplaces, including all bars and restaurants
Indianola, banned in all enclosed workplaces, including all bars and restaurants
Isola, banned in all enclosed workplaces, including all bars and restaurants
Itta Bena, banned in all enclosed workplaces, including all bars and restaurants
Iuka, banned in all enclosed workplaces, including all bars and restaurants
Louisville, banned in all enclosed workplaces, including all bars and restaurants 
Magee, banned in all enclosed workplaces, including all bars and restaurants
Mantachie, banned in all enclosed workplaces, including all bars and restaurants
Mendenhall, banned in all enclosed workplaces, including all bars and restaurants
Monticello, banned in all bars and restaurants, but not all other enclosed workplaces
Moorhead, banned in all enclosed workplaces, including all bars and restaurants
Nettleton, February 5, 2015, banned in all enclosed workplaces, including bars and restaurants
New Augusta, banned in all enclosed workplaces, including all bars and restaurants
Petal, banned in all enclosed workplaces, including all bars and restaurants
Pickens, banned in all enclosed workplaces, including all bars and restaurants
Pittsboro, banned in all enclosed workplaces, including all bars and restaurants
Plantersville, banned in all enclosed workplaces, including all bars and restaurants
Prentiss, banned in all enclosed workplaces, including all bars and restaurants
Rolling Fork, banned in all enclosed workplaces, including all bars and restaurants
Sidon, banned in all enclosed workplaces, including all bars and restaurants
Sledge, June 4, 2014, banned in all enclosed workplaces, including all bars and restaurants
Southaven, August 4, 2014, banned in all enclosed workplaces, including all bars and restaurants
State Line, banned in all enclosed workplaces, including all bars and restaurants
Sumner, banned in all enclosed workplaces, including all bars and restaurants
Tupelo, banned in all enclosed workplaces, including all bars and restaurants
Tutwiler, banned in all enclosed workplaces, including all bars and restaurants
Walnut, banned in all enclosed workplaces, including all bars and restaurants
Walnut Grove, banned in all enclosed workplaces, including bars and restaurants
Weir, banned in all enclosed workplaces, including all bars and restaurants
Wesson, banned in all enclosed workplaces, including all bars and restaurants
Wiggins, banned in all enclosed workplaces, including all bars and restaurants
Woodville, banned in all enclosed workplaces, including all bars and restaurantsLocalities with vaping bans that do not include all bars and restaurants (2 total):Diamondhead, banned in all enclosed workplaces, including restaurants but exempting bars
Flowood, banned in all enclosed workplaces, including restaurants but exempting bars

MissouriLocalities with a vaping ban that includes all bars and restaurants (9 total):Branson, July 1, 2015, banned in all enclosed public places and workplaces by unanimous Board of Aldermen vote in October 2014; exempts up to 20% of designated hotel and motel smoking rooms, tobacco shops, smoking lounges in tobacco-related businesses, private homes, outdoor areas in places of employment, outdoor patios of restaurants, and golf courses.
Clinton, March 1, 2015, banned in all enclosed workplaces, including bars and restaurants
Columbia, banned in all workplaces, including bars and restaurants; exempts rented social halls, separately ventilated offices occupied exclusively by smokers, stage performances, retail tobacco shops, and private clubs with no employees.
Creve Coeur, January 2, 2011, banned by unanimous city council vote in all enclosed workplaces, including bars and restaurants; exempts cigar bars, private clubs, tobacco shops, and hotel/motel designated smoking rooms
Farmington, November 13, 2015, banned in all enclosed workplaces, including bars and restaurants, after public vote of 59%-41% and including within  of entrances; exempts cigar bars, vape shops, hotel rooms, private clubs, and nursing homes
Gainesville, banned in all enclosed workplaces, including bars and restaurants
Kansas City, banned in all indoor workplaces, including bars and restaurants
St. Joseph, June 7, 2014, banned in all enclosed workplaces and public places, including all bars, restaurants, and private and semiprivate rooms in nursing homes, after public vote of 52.75%–47.25%; exempts private vehicles and residences, 10% of hotel and motel rooms designated as smoking, private clubs (when no employees are present), and casino gaming areas (including bars, restaurants, and lounges within those gaming areas). Though the city-wide smoking ban remains intact, the vaping ban itself was lifted in 2016 due to a state law which was passed then, prohibiting e-cigarettes and vape products from being regulated in the same way as tobacco. In 2019 the city-wide vaping ban was reinstated, via a separate ordinance, by a unanimous vote from the City Council.
Washington, April 15, 2013, banned in all enclosed workplaces, including bars and restaurants by unanimous city council vote; also banned in private rooms in nursing homes; exempts only private residences not serving as a workplace and designated smoking rooms in hotels and motels; exempts hookah lounges until April 15, 2014

Montana
Montana governor  Steve Bullock announced a statewide ban on the sale of flavored vaping products. This ban will take effect on October 22, 2019 and will affect both retail in shops and online. The restriction will last for 4 months.

New HampshireNo statewide vaping ban. Instead, vaping is prohibited only in public educational facilities and on grounds thereof. All other indoor places that are covered by the New Hampshire Clean Indoor Air Act, including bars and restaurants, are entirely exempt from the state's regulations. Localities are prohibited from regulating vaping more stringently as they are prohibited from regulating smoking more stringently.

New JerseyStatewide vaping ban. On March 13, 2010, a law went into effect prohibited vaping everywhere that smoking is banned, which is in all enclosed workplaces, including bars and restaurants. Localities may regulate vaping more stringently. (NJ Title 26:3D-55 - 60)

New MexicoLocalities with vaping bans that include all bars and restaurants (1 total):Santa Fe, banned in all enclosed workplaces, including bars and restaurantsLocalities with vaping bans that do not include all bars and restaurants (1 total):Carlsbad, banned in all enclosed workplaces, exempting bars and restaurants

New YorkStatewide vaping ban. On November 22, 2017, a law went into effect prohibiting vaping everywhere that smoking is banned, including all enclosed workplaces, bars and restaurants.Localities with a vaping ban that include all bars and restaurants (6 total): Albany, banned in all enclosed workplaces, including bars and restaurants 
Cattaraugus County, banned in bars and restaurants, but not other workplaces
Lynbrook, banned in bars and restaurants, but not other workplaces
New York City, prohibited to anyone under 21 years of age; also prohibited everywhere smoking is banned indoors and out; vaping is allowed only in e-cigarette shops
Suffolk County, prohibited to anyone under 21 years of age; also prohibited everywhere smoking is banned indoors and out
Tompkins County, banned in all enclosed workplaces, including bars and restaurants
Westchester County, banned in all enclosed workplaces, including bars and restaurantsLocalities with vaping bans that do not include bars and restaurants (1 total):Broome County, New York, banned in and near county buildings.

North Carolina
Localities may regulate vaping indoors, but not in bars and restaurants.
Asheville, March 10, 2015, banned from city buses, parks and greenways and in facilities such as the U.S. Cellular Center
Waynesville, May 23, 2015, banned on sidewalks, public parks, parking lots, greenways, city vehicles and the area in and surrounding town buildings

North DakotaStatewide vaping ban. On November 6, 2012, by a vote of 66%-34%, North Dakota voters ratified Initiative Measure Four, which, upon taking effect in December 2012, amends North Dakota's existing partial smoking ban so as to ban smoking statewide in all enclosed public places and places of employment, including all bars, restaurants, and tobacco stores with all restrictions applying to e-cigarettes as well. The ban exempts only (1) private residences except when operating as a childcare or adult day care facility, (2) outdoor areas except within 20 feet of the entrance to a public place or place of employment, (3) businesses not open to the public with no employees besides the owner, and (4) American Indian religious and cultural rituals. Local governments may regulate vaping more stringently than the state.

OhioStatewide vaping ban: Effective September 30, 2021, according to Chapter 3794 of the Ohio Revised Code, vaping is prohibited in all places where smoking is prohibited (which includes bars and restaurants), with the exception of retail establishments that make at least 80% of their gross revenue from the sale of vaping products.

OklahomaNo statewide vaping ban. Instead, vaping is only prohibited in all Dept. of Corrections facilities, including vehicles and grounds. Localities are prohibited from regulating vaping more stringently than the state. Also, sales, gifts and furnishing of vapor products to persons under the age of 18 are subject to legal action the same way as if it were alcohol to a person under 21.

OregonStatewide vaping ban: Effective January 1, 2016, vaping is prohibited in all smoke free areas, which includes bars and restaurants. Localities may regulate vaping more stringently than the state. On October 4, 2019, Oregon Governor Kate Brown issued a 180-day ban on the sale of flavored vapes.

Pennsylvania
Philadelphia, banned in all enclosed workplaces, exempting bars where food accounts for less than 10% of sales and alcohol accounts for more than 90% of sales, and persons under 18 are prohibited. Philadelphia's ordinance is the only local vaping ban in Pennsylvania. Vaping is also banned at all city parks.

Rhode IslandStatewide vaping ban: Use of electronic nicotine delivery systems included in definition of “smoking” and prohibited in same places smoking is prohibited (23 R.I. Gen. Laws Ann. §§ 23-20.10-2(19) (2018) (definition of smoking)), including public places, health care facilities, child and adult day care facilities, common areas of multi-unit housing (more than 4 units), public transportation, schools and indoor and outdoor sports arenas (23 R.I. Gen. Laws Ann. § 23-20.10-3 (2018)); workplaces (23 R.I. Gen. Laws Ann. § 23-20.10-4 (2018)), with some exceptions (23 R.I. Gen. Laws Ann. §§ 23-20.10-6; 23-20.10-6.1(2018)). Possession and use of e-cigarettes, including by visitors, prohibited in all Rhode Island Department of Corrections facilities, vehicles and property. 240-20 R.I. Code R. §§ 1.6(D), 1.16(D) (2018).

South CarolinaLocalities with a vaping ban that include all bars and restaurants.  (6 total):Denmark, banned in all enclosed workplaces, including all bars and restaurants
Estill, May 1, 2013, banned in all enclosed workplaces, including all bars and restaurants
Hartsville, banned in all enclosed workplaces, including all bars and restaurants 
Inman, banned in all enclosed workplaces, including all bars and restaurants
West Pelzer, banned in all enclosed workplaces, including all bars and restaurants
Yemassee, August 9, 2013, banned in all enclosed workplaces, including all bars and restaurants

South DakotaNo statewide vaping ban. Instead, vaping is only prohibited in Department of Corrections facilities and on grounds thereof, by both employees and inmates. All other indoor places, including bars and restaurants, are entirely exempt from the state's regulations, and it remains unclear whether or not local government are allowed to regulate their usage more stringently.

TexasLocalities with vaping bans that include all bars and restaurants (18 total):Austin, banned in all enclosed workplaces, including bars and restaurants.
Bonham, banned in bars and restaurants, but not other workplaces
Denton, April 22, 2015, banned in all enclosed workplaces, including bars and restaurants; previous smoking ordinance that allowed smoking in bars did not include e-cigarettes
Desoto, January 1, 2016, banned in all enclosed workplaces, including bars and restaurants 
Duncanville, May 1, 2016, banned in all enclosed workplaces, including bars and restaurants
Edinburg, December 1, 2015, banned in all enclosed workplaces, including bars and restaurants
El Paso, banned in all enclosed workplaces, including bars and restaurants
Frisco, banned in all enclosed workplaces, including bars and restaurants
Harlingen, banned in all enclosed workplaces, including bars and restaurants
Laredo, banned in all area's of the city, including bars and restaurants.
Lufkin, banned in all enclosed workplaces, including bars and restaurants
San Angelo, banned in all enclosed workplaces, including bars and restaurants
San Marcos, banned in all enclosed workplaces, including bars and restaurants
Seagoville, March 3, 2016, banned in all enclosed workplaces, including bars and restaurants
Sherman, banned in bars and restaurants, but not other workplaces
Socorro, banned in all enclosed workplaces, including bars and restaurants
Tyler, banned in all places where traditional tobacco smoking is banned, all city owned property, and all privately owned bars and restaurants.  Exemptions are available for retail tobacco and vaping shops
Waco, January 1, 2016, banned in all enclosed workplaces, including bars and restaurants
Waxahachie, banned in all enclosed workplaces, including bars and restaurantsLocalities with vaping bans that do not include all bars and restaurants (7 total):Bedford, banned in restaurants, but not bars or other enclosed workplaces
Boerne, banned in restaurants, but not bars or other enclosed workplaces
Burkburnett, banned in all enclosed workplaces, including restaurants but exempting bars 
Highland Village Texas, June 1, 2011 banned in all enclosed public places as well as restaurants; the law is silent as to whether or not bars are included
Joshua, banned in all enclosed public places as well as restaurants; the law is silent as to whether or not bars are included
Weatherford, banned in restaurants, but not bars or other enclosed workplaces
Wichita Falls, banned in all enclosed workplaces, exempting bars and restaurants

UtahStatewide vaping ban: Effective January 1, 2011, vaping is prohibited in all indoor places exempting only (1) designated hotel/motel smoking rooms, (2) areas of owner-operated businesses with no employees besides the owner, and (3) American Indian religious and cultural ceremonies. Since the state law supersedes any ordinances passed by political subdivisions of the state (i.e., cities, counties, school districts, agencies, etc.), such political subdivisions are preempted from regulating indoor smoking or vaping any more or less stringently than the Act.[401]

VermontStatewide vaping ban: Effective January 1, 2017, vaping is prohibited in public areas where smoking is banned.

VirginiaNo statewide vaping ban. Instead, vaping is prohibited on Virginia Railway Express trains, all northern schools, and limited to 100 feet on north end of station platforms. All other indoor places can freely permit vaping if they choose. The law is silent as to whether local governments can regulate vaping more stringently than the state, since they are forbidden from regulating smoking more stringently.

WashingtonNo statewide vaping ban. Washington State Ferries forbids vaping on its vessels as per an announcement given on every sailing. A 4 month ban on flavored vaping products was enacted in October 2019.Localities with vaping bans that include all bars and restaurants (6 total):Grant County, banned in all enclosed workplaces, including bars and restaurants; vaping is allowed only in e-cigarette shops
King County, banned in all enclosed workplaces, including bars and restaurants
Pasco, banned in all enclosed workplaces, including bars and restaurants
Pierce County, banned in all enclosed workplaces, including bars and restaurants
Snohomish County, banned 25 feet from public places and enclosed areas and outdoor venues. Only tribal businesses on reservation land and permitted vape product retail shops are exempted per section 14.7 of Health District Sanitary Code 13.2 and 14.6.
Whatcom County, banned in all enclosed workplaces, including bars and restaurants

West VirginiaLocalities with a vaping ban that include all bars and restaurants (24 total):Barbour County, banned in all enclosed workplaces, including bars and restaurants 
Berkeley County, banned in all enclosed workplaces, including bars and restaurants 
Brooke County, banned in all enclosed workplaces, including bars and restaurants
Calhoun County, banned in all enclosed workplaces, including bars and restaurants
Grant County, banned in all enclosed workplaces, including bars and restaurants
Greenbrier County,  banned in all enclosed workplaces, including bars and restaurants
Hampshire County, banned in all enclosed workplaces, including bars and restaurants
Hancock County, banned in all enclosed workplaces, including bars and restaurants
Lewis County, banned in all enclosed workplaces, including bars and restaurants
Mason County, banned in all enclosed workplaces, including bars and restaurants
Mineral County, banned in all enclosed workplaces, including bars and restaurants
Monroe County, banned in all enclosed workplaces, including bars and restaurants
Nicholas County, banned in all enclosed workplaces, including bars and restaurants
Ohio County, banned in all enclosed workplaces, including bars and restaurants
Pleasants County, banned in all enclosed workplaces, including bars and restaurants
Preston County, banned in all enclosed workplaces, including bars and restaurants
Randolph County, banned in all enclosed workplaces, including bars and restaurants
Ritchie County, banned in all enclosed workplaces, including bars and restaurants
Roane County, banned in all enclosed workplaces, including bars and restaurants
Taylor County, banned in all enclosed workplaces, including bars and restaurants
Tucker County, banned in all enclosed workplaces, including bars and restaurants 
Upshur County, banned in all enclosed workplaces, including bars and restaurants
Wirt County, banned in all enclosed workplaces, including bars and restaurants
Wood County, banned in all enclosed workplaces, including bars and restaurantsLocalities with a vaping ban that do not include all bars and restaurants (5 total):Marshall County, banned in all restaurants, but not bars or all other workplaces
Mercer County, banned in all enclosed workplaces, including restaurants but exempting bars
Morgan County, banned in all enclosed workplaces, including restaurants but exempting bars
Webster County, banned in all enclosed workplaces, including restaurants but exempting bars
Wyoming County, banned in all enclosed workplaces except bars and restaurants

WisconsinNo statewide vaping ban. Instead, vaping is only prohibited at indoor facilities of State Fair and at main stage area. All other places covered by the state's smoking regulations, including bars and restaurants, are entirely exempt and may permit vaping if they choose. Local governments may regulate vaping more stringently than the state, so long as it's to have smoke-free laws that address the provision of vaping alongside all smoke-free areas.Localities with vaping bans that include all bars and restaurants (10 total):'''
Ashwaubenon, banned in all enclosed workplaces, including bars and restaurants
Dane County, banned in all enclosed workplaces, including bars and restaurants 
Florence County, banned in all enclosed workplaces, including bars and restaurants
Greenfield, banned in all enclosed workplaces, including bars and restaurants
Janesville, banned in all enclosed workplaces, including bars and restaurants
Jefferson County, banned in all enclosed workplaces, including bars and restaurants
La Crosse County, banned in all enclosed workplaces, including bars and restaurants
Madison, banned in all enclosed workplaces, including bars and restaurants; vaping is only allowed in retail e-cigarette shops
Milwaukee, banned in all enclosed workplaces, including bars and restaurants
Onalaska, banned in all enclosed workplaces, including bars and restaurants
Wausau, banned in all enclosed workplaces, including bars and restaurants

Wyoming
Laramie, banned in bars and restaurants, but not other workplaces; ban includes private clubs

See also 

 Tobacco 21

References

Smoking cessation
Law of the United States
Electronic cigarettes